is a black-and-white Japanese film released in 1951. The film was directed by Shunkai Mizuho and stars Hibari Misora.

Cast
 Masao Wakahara - Yūji Makita
 Kuniko Miyake - Sanae Shimura
 Hibari Misora - Sanae's daughter Emiko
 Ryūji Kita - Sanae's father Taishaku
 Chiyoko Fumiya
 Shin'yō Nara - doctor
 Mutsuko Sakura
 Ichirō Shimizu - Murai
 Akira Takaya - travelling druggist
 Kentarō Taki

Plot
Yūji Makita, a guitar player and singer played by Masao Wakahara, comes to a portside onsen (spa resort) town. Thirteen years prior, he had had a love affair there with Sanae Shimura (played by Kuniko Miyake) which ended poorly; Sanae has since moved to Tokyo, leaving behind her daughter Emiko (played by Hibari Misora) and father Taishaku (Ryūji Kita).

Waiting for her mother to return, Emiko often sits by the water singing a song her mother taught her. As Yūji composed this song himself, and never shared it with anyone but Sanae, he realizes that Emiko must be his daughter. He sends a false telegram to Sanae, saying that Emiko is sick, and that she should come home. Sanae returns, escaping from a man named Murai, from whom she had borrowed money when her father was ill.

Sanae spots Yūji upon her return to the port town, but he disappears again, leaving a note saying that he will visit again, for his daughter's sake. Sanae leaves for Tokyo the very next day, with Emiko, but fails to find Yūji and returns home.

Some time later, they discover Yūji's name in the newspaper, which says that he has been selected to compete in a competition of music composers. Yūji is in the hospital, however, bedridden, and so, in the end, Emiko takes his place in the contest, her parents listening on a radio in the hospital.

References

Japanese black-and-white films
1951 films
Shochiku films
Japanese drama films
1951 drama films
1950s Japanese films